Marie Anusorn School is a private school located in Buriram Province, Thailand. It admits primary and secondary students. Founded in 1982. The school's former names was "Anuban Marie Anusorn School".

Campus 
Buriram Pittayakhom School is located at 100 Chum Het, Muang District, Buriram Province.

The school has more seven buildings: Yoakim, Joseph, Benedik, Dominik, Nicholas and Johnpohn 1–2. Each of which is located separately in the school area, but Yoakim and Joseph have linking bridge.

References

Buildings and structures in Buriram province
Schools in Buriram Province